The International Bluegrass Music Association, or IBMA, is a trade association to promote bluegrass music.

Formed in 1985, IBMA established its first headquarters in Owensboro, Kentucky.  In 1988 they announced plans to create the International Bluegrass Music Museum as a joint venture with RiverPark Center in Owensboro.  In 1987 IBMA established the World of Bluegrass, a combination trade show, concert, and awards presentation.  This was originally set in Owensboro, before moving to Louisville, Kentucky in 1997.  Nashville, Tennessee hosted this event from 2005 through 2012. Since 2013, the event has been hosted in Raleigh, North Carolina.  In 1991 IBMA established the International Bluegrass Music Hall of Honor at the International Bluegrass Music Museum to recognize lifetime contributions to bluegrass, both by performers and non-performers.  In 2003 IBMA relocated its offices to Nashville, Tennessee. Winners are chosen by the 2,500 members of the International Bluegrass Music Association.

Hall of Fame 

Hall of Fame Inductees
Norman Blake - 2022
Paul "Moon" Mullins - 2022
Peter Rowan - 2022
Alison Krauss - 2021
Lynn Morris - 2021
The Stoneman Family - 2021
J.T. Gray - 2020
The Johnson Mountain Boys - 2020
New Grass Revival - 2020
The Kentucky Colonels - 2019
Bill Emerson - 2019
Mike Auldridge - 2019
Vassar Clements - 2018
Tom T. and Dixie Hall - 2018
Mike Seeger - 2018
Allen Shelton - 2018
Ricky Skaggs - 2018
Jake Tullock - 2018
Joe Val - 2018
Paul Williams - 2018
Terry Woodward - 2018
Bobby Hicks - 2017
Alice Gerrard and Hazel Dickens - 2017
Roland White - 2017
Clarence White - 2016
The Rounder founders - 2016
Larry Sparks - 2015
Bill Keith - 2015
The Original Seldom Scene - 2014
Neil Rosenberg - 2014
Tony Rice - 2013
Paul Warren - 2013
Doyle Lawson - 2012
Ralph Rinzler - 2012
Del McCoury - 2011
George Shuffler - 2011
John Hartford - 2010
Louise Scruggs - 2010
The Dillards - 2009
Lonesome Pine Fiddlers - 2009
Bill Clifton - 2008
Charles K. Wolfe - 2008
Carl Story - 2007
Howard Staton “Cedric Rainwater” Watts - 2007
The Lewis Family - 2006
Syd Nathan - 2006
Red Allen - 2005
Benny Martin - 2005
Curly Seckler - 2004
Bill Vernon - 2004
J. D. Crowe - 2003
David Freeman - 2002
The Lilly Brothers & Don Stover - 2002
The Carter Family - 2001
Arthel "Doc" Watson - 2000
Lance LeRoy - 2000
Kenny Baker - 1999
Chubby Wise - 1998
Carlton Haney - 1998
Josh Graves - 1997
The Country Gentlemen - 1996
Pete Kuykendall - 1996
Jimmy Martin - 1995
The Osborne Brothers - 1994
Mac Wiseman - 1993
Jim & Jesse McReynolds - 1993
Don Reno & Arthur Lee "Red" Smiley - 1992
The Stanley Brothers, Carter & Ralph - 1992
Bill Monroe - 1991
Earl Scruggs - 1991
Lester Flatt - 1991

Entertainer of the year 

 1990: Hot Rize
 1991: Alison Krauss & Union Station
 1992: Nashville Bluegrass Band
 1993: Nashville Bluegrass Band
 1994: Del McCoury Band
 1995: Alison Krauss & Union Station
 1996: Del McCoury Band
 1997: Del McCoury Band
 1998: Del McCoury Band
 1999: Del McCoury Band
 2000: Del McCoury Band
 2001: Rhonda Vincent & the Rage
 2002: Del McCoury Band
 2003: Del McCoury Band
 2004: Del McCoury Band
 2005: Cherryholmes
 2006: The Grascals
 2007: The Grascals
 2008: Dailey & Vincent
 2009: Dailey & Vincent
 2010: Dailey & Vincent
 2011: Steve Martin and the Steep Canyon Rangers
 2012: The Gibson Brothers
 2013: The Gibson Brothers
 2014: Balsam Range
 2015: The Earls of Leicester
 2016: The Earls of Leicester
 2017: The Earls of Leicester
 2018: Balsam Range
 2019: Joe Mullins & The Radio Ramblers
2020: Sister Sadie
 2021: Billy Strings

References

External links 
 IBMA: http://www.ibma.org
IBMA World of Bluegrass: http://www.worldofbluegrass.org

Bluegrass music
Music organizations based in the United States